Ischnura cervula, the Pacific forktail, is a species of narrow-winged damselfly in the family Coenagrionidae. It is found in Central America and North America.

The IUCN conservation status of Ischnura cervula is "LC", least concern, with no immediate threat to the species' survival. The population is stable. The IUCN status was reviewed in 2018.

References

Further reading

External links

 

Ischnura
Articles created by Qbugbot
Insects described in 1876